María Virginia Zonta (born 30 September 1989, Santa Fe) is an Argentine beach volleyball player. In 2012, she played with Ana Gallay. They participated in the 2012 Summer Olympics tournament and lost their three pool matches.

References 

1989 births
Living people
Argentine beach volleyball players
Women's beach volleyball players
Beach volleyball players at the 2012 Summer Olympics
Olympic beach volleyball players of Argentina
Beach volleyball players at the 2011 Pan American Games
Pan American Games competitors for Argentina
Argentine people of Italian descent

Sportspeople from Santa Fe, Argentina